Choline  is a cation with the chemical formula . Choline forms various salts, for example choline chloride and choline bitartrate.

Chemistry
Choline is a quaternary ammonium cation. The cholines are a family of water-soluble quaternary ammonium compounds. Choline is the parent compound of the cholines class, consisting of ethanolamine residue having three methyl groups attached to the same nitrogen atom. Choline hydroxide is known as choline base. It is hygroscopic and thus often encountered as a colorless viscous hydrated syrup that smells of trimethylamine (TMA). Aqueous solutions of choline are stable, but the compound slowly breaks down to ethylene glycol, polyethylene glycols, and TMA.

Choline chloride can be made by treating TMA with 2-chloroethanol:

The 2-chloroethanol can be generated from ethylene oxide. Choline has historically been produced from natural sources, such as via hydrolysis of lecithin.

Choline in nature
Choline is widespread in nature in living beings. In most animals, choline phospholipids are necessary components in cell membranes, in the membranes of cell organelles, and in very low-density lipoproteins.

Choline as a nutrient
Choline is an essential nutrient for humans and many other animals. Humans are capable of some de novo synthesis of choline but require additional choline in the diet to maintain health. Dietary requirements can be met by choline by itself or in the form of choline phospholipids, such as phosphatidylcholine. Choline is not formally classified as a vitamin despite being an essential nutrient with an amino acid–like structure and metabolism.

Choline is required to produce acetylcholine – a neurotransmitter – and S-adenosylmethionine (SAM), a universal methyl donor. Upon methylation SAM is transformed into homocysteine.

Symptomatic choline deficiency causes non-alcoholic fatty liver disease and muscle damage. Excessive consumption of choline (greater than 7.5 grams per day) can cause low blood pressure, sweating, diarrhea and fish-like body smell due to trimethylamine, which forms in the metabolism of choline. Rich dietary sources of choline and choline phospholipids include organ meats, egg yolks, dairy products, peanuts, certain beans, nuts and seeds. Vegetables with pasta and rice also contribute to choline intake in the American diet.

Metabolism

Biosynthesis 

In plants, the first step in de novo biosynthesis of choline is the decarboxylation of serine into ethanolamine, which is catalyzed by a serine decarboxylase. The synthesis of choline from ethanolamine may take place in three parallel pathways, where three consecutive N-methylation steps catalyzed by a methyl transferase are carried out on either the free-base, phospho-bases, or phosphatidyl-bases. The source of the methyl group is S-adenosyl--methionine and S-adenosyl--homocysteine is generated as a side product.

In humans and most other animals, de novo synthesis of choline is via the phosphatidylethanolamine N-methyltransferase (PEMT) pathway, but biosynthesis is not enough to meet human requirements. In the hepatic PEMT route, 3-phosphoglycerate (3PG) receives 2 acyl groups from acyl-CoA forming a phosphatidic acid. It reacts with cytidine triphosphate to form cytidine diphosphate-diacylglycerol. Its hydroxyl group reacts with serine to form phosphatidylserine which decarboxylates to ethanolamine and phosphatidylethanolamine (PE) forms. A PEMT enzyme moves three methyl groups from three S-adenosyl methionines (SAM) donors to the ethanolamine group of the phosphatidylethanolamine to form choline in the form of a phosphatidylcholine. Three S-adenosylhomocysteines (SAHs) are formed as a byproduct.

Choline can also be released from more complex choline containing molecules. For example, phosphatidylcholines (PC) can be hydrolyzed to choline (Chol) in most cell types. Choline can also be produced by the CDP-choline route, cytosolic choline kinases (CK) phosphorylate choline with ATP to phosphocholine (PChol). This happens in some cell types like liver and kidney. Choline-phosphate cytidylyltransferases (CPCT) transform PChol to CDP-choline (CDP-Chol) with cytidine triphosphate (CTP). CDP-choline and diglyceride are transformed to PC by diacylglycerol cholinephosphotransferase (CPT).

In humans, certain PEMT-enzyme mutations and estrogen deficiency (often due to menopause) increase the dietary need for choline. In rodents, 70% of phosphatidylcholines are formed via the PEMT route and only 30% via the CDP-choline route. In knockout mice, PEMT inactivation makes them completely dependent on dietary choline.

Absorption 
In humans, choline is absorbed from the intestines via the SLC44A1 (CTL1) membrane protein via facilitated diffusion governed by the choline concentration gradient and the electrical potential across the enterocyte membranes. SLC44A1 has limited ability to transport choline: at high concentrations part of it is left unabsorbed. Absorbed choline leaves the enterocytes via the portal vein, passes the liver and enters systemic circulation. Gut microbes degrade the unabsorbed choline to trimethylamine, which is oxidized in the liver to trimethylamine N-oxide.

Phosphocholine and glycerophosphocholines are hydrolyzed via phospholipases to choline, which enters the portal vein. Due to their water solubility, some of them escape unchanged to the portal vein. Fat-soluble choline-containing compounds (phosphatidylcholines and sphingomyelins) are either hydrolyzed by phospholipases or enter the lymph incorporated into chylomicrons.

Transport 
In humans, choline is transported as a free molecule in blood. Choline–containing phospholipids and other substances, like glycerophosphocholines, are transported in blood lipoproteins. Blood plasma choline levels in healthy fasting adults is 7–20 micromoles per liter (μmol/L) and 10 μmol/L on average. Levels are regulated, but choline intake and deficiency alters these levels. Levels are elevated for about 3 hours after choline consumption. Phosphatidylcholine levels in the plasma of fasting adults is 1.5–2.5 mmol/L. Its consumption elevates the free choline levels for about 8–12 hours, but does not affect phosphatidylcholine levels significantly.

Choline is a water-soluble ion and thus requires transporters to pass through fat-soluble cell membranes. Three types of choline transporters are known:
 SLC5A7
 CTLs: CTL1 (SLC44A1), CTL2 (SLC44A2) and CTL4 (SLC44A4)
 OCTs: OCT1 (SLC22A1) and OCT2 (SLC22A2)

SLC5A7s are sodium- (Na+) and ATP-dependent transporters. They have high binding affinity for choline, transport it primarily to neurons and are indirectly associated with the acetylcholine production. Their deficient function causes hereditary weakness in the pulmonary and other muscles in humans via acetylcholine deficiency. In knockout mice, their dysfunction results easily in death with cyanosis and paralysis.

CTL1s have moderate affinity for choline and transport it in almost all tissues, including the intestines, liver, kidneys, placenta and mitochondria. CTL1s supply choline for phosphatidylcholine and trimethylglycine production. CTL2s occur especially in the mitochondria in the tongue, kidneys, muscles and heart. They are associated with the mitochondrial oxidation of choline to trimethylglycine. CTL1s and CTL2s are not associated with the acetylcholine production, but transport choline together via the blood–brain barrier. Only CTL2s occur on the brain side of the barrier. They also remove excess choline from the neurons back to blood. CTL1s occur only on the blood side of the barrier, but also on the membranes of astrocytes and neurons.

OCT1s and OCT2s are not associated with the acetylcholine production. They transport choline with low affinity. OCT1s transport choline primarily in the liver and kidneys; OCT2s in kidneys and the brain.

Storage 
Choline is stored in the cell membranes and organelles as phospholipids, and inside cells as phosphatidylcholines and glycerophosphocholines.

Excretion 
Even at choline doses of 2–8 g, little choline is excreted into urine in humans. Excretion happens via transporters that occur within kidneys (see transport). Trimethylglycine is demethylated in the liver and kidneys to dimethylglycine (tetrahydrofolate receives one of the methyl groups). Methylglycine forms, is excreted into urine, or is demethylated to glycine.

Function 
Choline and its derivatives have many functions in humans and in other organisms. The most notable function is that choline serves as a synthetic precursor for other essential cell components and signalling molecules, such as phospholipids that form cell membranes, the neurotransmitter acetylcholine, and the osmoregulator trimethylglycine (betaine). Trimethylglycine in turn serves as a source of methyl groups by participating in the biosynthesis of S-adenosylmethionine.

Phospholipid precursor 
Choline is transformed to different phospholipids, like phosphatidylcholines and sphingomyelins. These are found in all cell membranes and the membranes of most cell organelles. Phosphatidylcholines are structurally important part of the cell membranes. In humans 40–50% of their phospholipids are phosphatidylcholines.

Choline phospholipids also form lipid rafts in the cell membranes along with cholesterol. The rafts are centers, for example for receptors and receptor signal transduction enzymes.

Phosphatidylcholines are needed for the synthesis of VLDLs: 70–95% of their phospholipids are phosphatidylcholines in humans.

Choline is also needed for the synthesis of pulmonary surfactant, which is a mixture consisting mostly of phosphatidylcholines. The surfactant is responsible for lung elasticity, that is for lung tissue's ability to contract and expand. For example, deficiency of phosphatidylcholines in the lung tissues has been linked to acute respiratory distress syndrome.

Phosphatidylcholines are excreted into bile and work together with bile acid salts as surfactants in it, thus helping with the intestinal absorption of lipids.

Acetylcholine synthesis 
Choline is needed to produce acetylcholine. This is a neurotransmitter which plays a necessary role in muscle contraction, memory and neural development, for example. Nonetheless, there is little acetylcholine in the human body relative to other forms of choline. Neurons also store choline in the form of phospholipids to their cell membranes for the production of acetylcholine.

Source of trimethylglycine 
In humans, choline is oxidized irreversibly in liver mitochondria to glycine betaine aldehyde by choline oxidases. This is oxidized by mitochondrial or cytosolic betaine-aldehyde dehydrogenases to trimethylglycine. Trimethylglycine is a necessary osmoregulator. It also works as a substrate for the BHMT-enzyme, which methylates homocysteine to methionine. This is a S-adenosylmethionine (SAM) precursor. SAM is a common reagent in biological methylation reactions. For example, it methylates guanidines of DNA and certain lysines of histones. Thus it is part of gene expression and epigenetic regulation. Choline deficiency thus leads to elevated homocysteine levels and decreased SAM levels in blood.

Content in foods 
Choline occurs in foods as a free molecule and in the form of phospholipids, especially as phosphatidylcholines. Choline is highest in organ meats and egg yolks though it is found to a lesser degree in non-organ meats, grains, vegetables, fruit and dairy products. Cooking oils and other food fats have about 5 mg/100 g of total choline. In the United States, food labels express the amount of choline in a serving as a percentage of daily value (%DV) based on the adequate intake of 550 mg/day. 100% of the daily value means that a serving of food has 550 mg of choline. "Total choline" is defined as the sum of free choline and choline-containing phospholipids, without accounting for mass fraction.

Human breast milk is rich in choline. Exclusive breastfeeding corresponds to about 120 mg of choline per day for the baby. Increase in a mother's choline intake raises the choline content of breast milk and low intake decreases it. Infant formulas may or may not contain enough choline. In the EU and the US, it is mandatory to add at least 7 mg of choline per 100 kilocalories (kcal) to every infant formula. In the EU, levels above 50 mg/100 kcal are not allowed.

Trimethylglycine is a functional metabolite of choline. It substitutes for choline nutritionally, but only partially. High amounts of trimethylglycine occur in wheat bran (1,339 mg/100 g), toasted wheat germ (1,240 mg/100 g) and spinach (600–645 mg/100 g), for example.

Daily values 

The following table contains updated sources of choline to reflect the new Daily Value and the new Nutrition Facts and Supplement Facts Labels. It reflects data from the U.S. Department of Agriculture, Agricultural Research Service. FoodData Central, 2019.

DV = Daily Value. The U.S. Food and Drug Administration (FDA) developed DVs to help consumers compare the nutrient contents of foods and dietary supplements within the context of a total diet. The DV for choline is 550 mg for adults and children age 4 years and older. The FDA does not require food labels to list choline content unless choline has been added to the food. Foods providing 20% or more of the DV are considered to be high sources of a nutrient, but foods providing lower percentages of the DV also contribute to a healthful diet.

The U.S. Department of Agriculture's (USDA's) FoodData Central lists the nutrient content of many foods and provides a comprehensive list of foods containing choline arranged by nutrient content.

Dietary recommendations
Insufficient data is available to establish an estimated average requirement (EAR) for choline, so the Food and Nutrition Board (FNB) established adequate intakes (AIs). For adults, the AI for choline was set at 550 mg/day for men and 425 mg/day for women. These values have been shown to prevent hepatic alteration in men. However, the study used to derive these values did not evaluate whether less choline would be effective, as researchers only compared a choline-free diet to a diet containing 550 mg of choline per day. From this, the AIs for children and adolescents were extrapolated.

Recommendations are in milligrams per day (mg/day). The European Food Safety Authority (EFSA) recommendations are general recommendations for the EU countries. The EFSA has not set any upper limits for intake. Individual EU countries may have more specific recommendations. The National Academy of Medicine (NAM) recommendations apply in the United States, Australia and New Zealand.

Intake in populations
Twelve surveys undertaken in 9 EU countries between 2000 and 2011 estimated choline intake of adults in these countries to be 269–468 milligrams per day. Intake was 269–444 mg/day in adult women and 332–468 mg/day in adult men. Intake was 75–127 mg/day in infants, 151–210 mg/day in 1- to 3-year-olds, 177–304 mg/day in 3- to 10-year-olds and 244–373 mg/day in 10- to 18-year-olds. The total choline intake mean estimate was 336 mg/day in pregnant adolescents and 356 mg/day in pregnant women.

A study based on the NHANES 2009–2012 survey estimated the choline intake to be too low in some US subpopulations. Intake was 315.2–318.8 mg/d in 2+ year olds between this time period. Out of 2+ year olds, only % of males and % of females exceeded the adequate intake (AI). AI was exceeded by % of 2- to 3-year-olds, % of 4- to 8-year-olds, % of 9- to 13-year-olds, % of 14–18 and % of 19+ year olds. Upper intake level was not exceeded in any subpopulations.

A 2013–2014 NHANES study of the US population found the choline intake of 2- to 19-year-olds to be  mg/day and  mg/day in adults 20 and over. Intake was  mg/d in men 20 and over and 278 mg/d in women 20 and over.

Deficiency

Signs and symptoms
Symptomatic choline deficiency is rare in humans. Most obtain sufficient amounts of it from the diet and are able to biosynthesize limited amounts of it. Symptomatic deficiency is often caused by certain diseases or by other indirect causes. Severe deficiency causes muscle damage and non-alcoholic fatty liver disease, which may develop into cirrhosis.

Besides humans, fatty liver is also a typical sign of choline deficiency in other animals. Bleeding in the kidneys can also occur in some species. This is suspected to be due to deficiency of choline derived trimethylglycine, which functions as an osmoregulator.

Causes and mechanisms
Estrogen production is a relevant factor which predisposes individuals to deficiency along with low dietary choline intake. Estrogens activate phosphatidylcholine producing PEMT enzymes. Women before menopause have lower dietary need for choline than men due to women's higher estrogen production. Without estrogen therapy, the choline needs of post-menopausal women are similar to men's. Some single-nucleotide polymorphisms (genetic factors) affecting choline and folate metabolism are also relevant. Certain gut microbes also degrade choline more efficiently than others, so they are also relevant.

In deficiency, availability of phosphatidylcholines in the liver are decreased – these are needed for formation of VLDLs. Thus VLDL-mediated fatty acid transport out of the liver decreases leading to fat accumulation in the liver. Other simultaneously occurring mechanisms explaining the observed liver damage have also been suggested. For example, choline phospholipids are also needed in mitochondrial membranes. Their inavailability leads to the inability of mitochondrial membranes to maintain proper electrochemical gradient, which, among other things, is needed for degrading fatty acids via β-oxidation. Fat metabolism within liver therefore decreases.

Excess intake
Excessive doses of choline can have adverse effects. Daily 8–20 g doses of choline, for example, have been found to cause low blood pressure, nausea, diarrhea and fish-like body odor. The odor is due to trimethylamine (TMA) formed by the gut microbes from the unabsorbed choline (see trimethylaminuria).

The liver oxidizes TMA to trimethylamine N-oxide (TMAO). Elevated levels of TMA and TMAO in the body have been linked to increased risk of atherosclerosis and mortality. Thus, excessive choline intake has been hypothetized to increase these risks in addition to carnitine, which also is formed into TMA and TMAO by gut bacteria. However, choline intake has not been shown to increase the risk of dying from cardiovascular diseases. It is plausible that elevated TMA and TMAO levels are just a symptom of other underlying illnesses or genetic factors that predispose individuals for increased mortality. Such factors may have not been properly accounted for in certain studies observing TMA and TMAO level related mortality. Causality may be reverse or confounding and large choline intake might not increase mortality in humans. For example, kidney dysfunction predisposes for cardiovascular diseases, but can also decrease TMA and TMAO excretion.

Health effects

Neural tube closure

Low maternal intake of choline is associated with an increased risk of neural tube defects. Higher maternal intake of choline is likely associated with better neurocognition/neurodevelopment in children. Choline and folate, interacting with vitamin B12, act as methyl donors to homocysteine to form methionine, which can then go on to form SAM (S-adenosylmethionine). SAM is the substrate for almost all methylation reactions in mammals. It has been suggested that disturbed methylation via SAM could be responsible for the relation between folate and NTDs. This may also apply to choline. Certain mutations that disturb choline metabolism increase the prevalence of NTDs in newborns, but the role of dietary choline deficiency remains unclear,

Cardiovascular diseases and cancer
Choline deficiency can cause fatty liver, which increases cancer and cardiovascular disease risk. Choline deficiency also decreases SAM production, which partakes in DNA methylation – this decrease may also contribute to carcinogenesis. Thus, deficiency and its association with such diseases has been studied. However, observational studies of free populations have not convincingly shown an association between low choline intake and cardiovascular diseases or most cancers. Studies on prostate cancer have been contradictory.

Cognition
Studies observing the effect between higher choline intake and cognition have been conducted in human adults, with contradictory results. Similar studies on human infants and children have been contradictory and also limited.

Perinatal development

Both pregnancy and lactation increase demand for choline dramatically. This demand may be met by upregulation of PEMT via increasing estrogen levels to produce more choline de novo, but even with increased PEMT activity, the demand for choline is still so high that bodily stores are generally depleted. This is exemplified by the observation that Pemt −/− mice (mice lacking functional PEMT) will abort at 9–10 days unless fed supplemental choline.

While maternal stores of choline are depleted during pregnancy and lactation, the placenta accumulates choline by pumping choline against the concentration gradient into the tissue, where it is then stored in various forms, mostly as acetylcholine. Choline concentrations in amniotic fluid can be ten times higher than in maternal blood.

Functions in the fetus
Choline is in high demand during pregnancy as a substrate for building cellular membranes (rapid fetal and mother tissue expansion), increased need for one-carbon moieties (a substrate for methylation of DNA and other functions), raising choline stores in fetal and placental tissues, and for increased production of lipoproteins (proteins containing "fat" portions). In particular, there is interest in the impact of choline consumption on the brain. This stems from choline's use as a material for making cellular membranes (particularly in making phosphatidylcholine). Human brain growth is most rapid during the third trimester of pregnancy and continues to be rapid to approximately five years of age. During this time, the demand is high for sphingomyelin, which is made from phosphatidylcholine (and thus from choline), because this material is used to myelinate (insulate) nerve fibers. Choline is also in demand for the production of the neurotransmitter acetylcholine, which can influence the structure and organization of brain regions, neurogenesis, myelination, and synapse formation. Acetylcholine is even present in the placenta and may help control cell proliferation and differentiation (increases in cell number and changes of multiuse cells into dedicated cellular functions) and parturition.

Choline uptake into the brain is controlled by a low-affinity transporter located at the blood–brain barrier. Transport occurs when arterial blood plasma choline concentrations increase above 14 μmol/L, which can occur during a spike in choline concentration after consuming choline-rich foods. Neurons, conversely, acquire choline by both high- and low-affinity transporters. Choline is stored as membrane-bound phosphatidylcholine, which can then be used for acetylcholine neurotransmitter synthesis later. Acetylcholine is formed as needed, travels across the synapse, and transmits the signal to the following neuron. Afterwards, acetylcholinesterase degrades it, and the free choline is taken up by a high-affinity transporter into the neuron again.

Uses
Choline chloride and choline bitartrate are used in dietary supplements. Bitartrate is used more often due to its lower hygroscopicity. Certain choline salts are used to supplement chicken, turkey and some other animal feeds. Some salts are also used as industrial chemicals: for example, in photolithography to remove photoresist. Choline theophyllinate and choline salicylate are used as medicines, as well as structural analogs, like methacholine and carbachol. Radiolabeled cholines, like 11C-choline, are used in medical imaging. Other commercially used salts include tricholine citrate and choline bicarbonate.

Antagonists and inhibitors
Hundreds of choline antagonists and enzyme inhibitors have been developed for research purposes. Aminomethylpropanol is among the first ones used as a research tool. It inhibits choline and trimethylglycine synthesis. It is able to induce choline deficiency that in turn results in fatty liver in rodents. Diethanolamine is another such compound, but also an environmental pollutant. N-cyclohexylcholine inhibits choline uptake primarily in brains. Hemicholinium-3 is a more general inhibitor, but also moderately inhibits choline kinases. More specific choline kinase inhibitors have also been developed. Trimethylglycine synthesis inhibitors also exist: carboxybutylhomocysteine is an example of a specific BHMT inhibitor.

The cholinergic hypothesis of dementia has not only lead to medicinal acetylcholinesterase inhibitors, but also to a variety of acetylcholine inhibitors. Examples of such inhibiting research chemicals include triethylcholine, homocholine and many other N-ethyl derivates of choline, which are false neurotransmitter analogs of acetylcholine. Choline acetyltransferase inhibitors have also been developed.

History

Discovery
In 1849, Adolph Strecker was the first to isolate choline from pig bile. In 1852, L. Babo and M. Hirschbrunn extracted choline from white mustard seeds and named it sinkaline. In 1862, Strecker repeated his experiment with pig and ox bile, calling the substance choline for the first time after the Greek word for bile, chole, and identifying it with the chemical formula C5H13NO. In 1850, Theodore Nicolas Gobley extracted from the brains and roe of carps a substance he named lecithin after the Greek word for egg yolk, showing in 1874 that it was a mixture of phosphatidylcholines.

In 1865, Oscar Liebreich isolated "neurine" from animal brains. The structural formulas of acetylcholine and Liebreich's "neurine" were resolved by Adolf von Baeyer in 1867. Later that year "neurine" and sinkaline were shown to be the same substances as Strecker's choline. Thus, Bayer was the first to resolve the structure of choline. The compound now known as neurine is unrelated to choline.

Discovery as a nutrient
In the early 1930s, Charles Best and colleagues noted that fatty liver in rats on a special diet and diabetic dogs could be prevented by feeding them lecithin, proving in 1932 that choline in lecithin was solely responsible for this preventive effect. In 1998, the US National Academy of Medicine reported their first recommendations for choline in the human diet.

References 

Essential nutrients
Primary alcohols
Cholinergics
Quaternary ammonium compounds
Dietary supplements